FreeMIDI was a popular virtual studio management application by Mark of the Unicorn (MOTU) for the Classic Mac OS. It was used to mimic the physical setup of MIDI devices that are connected to the computer and provide applications and the Mac OS a way for referencing them. 

OMS by Opcode also performed similar duties. Some MIDI interfaces provided drivers for both FreeMIDI and OMS, while some only included drivers for one or the other. FreeMIDI included an OMS Compatibility Mode which allowed FreeMIDI to communicate with devices in OMS. 

Under macOS, neither FreeMIDI or OMS are used, as those duties are covered by macOS's included Audio MIDI Setup utility.

For those who still have or use Macs that can only run Classic Mac OS, OMS still exists in select music app archives online.

MIDI
Macintosh multimedia software